Futura (styled FUTURA) is a Dutch men's and womenswear brand founded in 2014 by Anne Bosman (born 24 June 1988 in Amsterdam) and Tom Renema (born 16 October 1990 in Deventer), later joined by Sanne Schepers (born 7 March 1989 in Heerlen). Futura ceased to exist in December 2016, after the trio decided to stop with their cooperation.

Background
Bosman is a 2014 graduate of Central Saint Martins London, with an MA degree in Menswear. He studied for a BA in Fashion Design at ArtEZ in Arnhem. With his graduation collection he won two H&M Design Awards in 2012.
Schepers also graduated in 2011 from ArtEZ Arnhem with a BA in Fashion Design. She proceeded to study at the Institut Français de la Mode  after she won the G-Star Lichting Award 2011. Renema graduated in 2013 from the HES School of Economics and Business in Amsterdam with a BA degree in International Business Management.

Style
A strong, clean and minimalistic appeal that mixes fashion with denim to create a futuristic denim look for the modern man. Its material focus is on Japanese and Italian denim, organic cotton, and other durable fabrics combined with Dutch and Portuguese manufacture quality. The T-shirts and sweats are all hand screen-printed to provide a custom made touch.

Collections
 Spring / Summer 2015 – Bikers on a plane
 Autumn / Winter 2015 – Back to the sign
 Spring / Summer 2016 – Club Futura, July 2015, Mercedes-Benz Fashion Week Amsterdam
 Autumn / Winter 2016 – Racing Ankersmit, January 2016, Mercedes-Benz Fashion Week Amsterdam & January 2016, SEEK Berlin
 Spring / Summer 2017 – Futura community, July 2016, Mercedes-Benz Fashion Week Amsterdam

References

External links
 

Clothing brands of the Netherlands